Bushey Meads School (also known as "BMS") is a coeducational secondary school and sixth form with academy status, located in Bushey, Hertfordshire, England. The school forms part of the Bushey St James Trust, in partnership with Little Reddings Primary School and Hartsbourne Primary School.

History 
The school was founded in 1957 as Bushey Secondary Modern School with a building designed for 636 pupils.

In 1998 Dr Dena Coleman became the head teacher at Bushey Meads School. The school had a budget of about £3m and it had over 1,000 secondary and sixth form pupils. It had become grant-maintained to balance its budgets but money was tight. The school suffered from small classrooms. Coleman was head of the school until 2005.

The school celebrated its 50th anniversary by taking a major role in the annual Bushey Carnival in 2007, basing some events on the history and successes of the school.

The name Bushey Meads derives from the original surrounding area. The site where the school buildings now stand was once mostly fields ("meads", from Old English ) surrounding the then small village of Bushey.

The school has been featured in TV programmes including Grange Hill.

Notable former pupils

 Charlie Goode – footballer
 George Michael – musician
 Simon Phillips – musician
 Andrew Ridgeley – musician
 Emily Staveley-Taylor – singer/actress The Staves

References 

Schools in Hertsmere
Secondary schools in Hertfordshire
Academies in Hertfordshire
Educational institutions established in 1957
1957 establishments in England